Thomas P. Walsh (born July 15, 1960 in Salem, Massachusetts) is an American politician who represented the 12th Essex district in the Massachusetts House of Representatives from 1987–1995 and served as a City Councilor in Peabody, Massachusetts from 1984–1987, and was elected to the same office again in 2014. In 2016, he returned to the Massachusetts House of Representatives by winning a special election to replace Leah Cole in the 12th Essex District.

See also
 2019–2020 Massachusetts legislature
 2021–2022 Massachusetts legislature

References

1960 births
Democratic Party members of the Massachusetts House of Representatives
People from Peabody, Massachusetts
Salem State University alumni
Living people
21st-century American politicians